Southland Records is a record label in New Orleans, Louisiana, United States specializing in blues and jazz.

Southland Records was founded in 1953 by Joe Mares, a clarinetist and younger brother of trumpeter Paul Mares. He created the label after realizing many musicians in New Orleans were unsigned to record labels. Mares recorded George Lewis, Papa Celestin, Sharkey Bonano, Nick LaRocca, and Raymond Burke.

Bands practiced at the label's studio behind Mares Brothers Furs, a company established by his father, uncle, and grandfather. Sessions were recorded at concert halls and at TV and radio stations. In the 1960s, Mares sold the label to George Buck and it became part of the Jazzology Records group under the control of the George H. Buck Jr. Jazz Foundation.

Roster
 Jimmy Ballero
 Big Bill Broonzy
 Wendell Brunious
 Dan Burley
 Red Callender
 Erving Charles
 Pops Foster
 Ernie Freeman
 Hezekiah and The Houserockers
 John Jackson
 Homesick James
 Thomas Jefferson
 Larry Johnson
 Robert Lockwood Jr.
 Eddie Kirkland
 Joe Lastie
 Booker T. Laury
 Albert Macon
 Ray Martinez
 Brownie McGhee
 Chuck Norris
 Piano Red
 Snooky Pryor
 Doctor Ross
 Sister Rosetta Tharpe
 The Soul Blues Boys
 Robert Thomas
 Son Thomas
 Henry & Vernell Townsend
 Eric Traub
 Floyd Turnham
 George Washington
 Robert Pete Williams
 Teddy Woods

References

External links
 Illustrated discography
 

Jazz record labels